Gynacantha nourlangie is a species of dragonfly in the family Aeshnidae, 
known as the cave duskhawker. 
It inhabits pools in caves in northern Australia.

Gynacantha nourlangie is a large, sandy brown dragonfly with a constricted waist in its abdomen at segment 3. It is a crepuscular insect and flies at dawn and dusk.
It is widely distributed across northern Australia, from the Kimberley in Western Australia, through the north of Northern Territory and Cape York in Queensland.

Etymology
Gynacantha nourlangie is named after Nourlangie Creek in western Arnhem Land, Northern Territory, Australia, where it can be found.

Gallery

See also
 List of Odonata species of Australia

References

Aeshnidae
Odonata of Australia
Insects of Australia
Taxa named by Günther Theischinger
Taxa named by J.A.L. (Tony) Watson
Insects described in 1991